The architect César Pelli has designed many noteworthy buildings in the span of his four-decade career; these include some of the tallest buildings in the world. The following are some of his major constructions:


Completed

1960s 
 1966: Worldway Postal Center, Los Angeles International Airport
 1967: Kukui Gardens housing, Honolulu, Hawaii
 1969: San Bernardino City Hall, San Bernardino, California
 1969: Century City Medical Plaza, Century City, Los Angeles, with architect Anthony J. Lumsden.
1969: COMSAT building, Clarksburg, MD

1970s 
 1973: Commons Centre and Mall, Columbus, Indiana-
 1973: Eaton's Department Store, Vancouver, British Columbia, Canada 
 1973: Bank of California building, San Jose, California
 1975: Pacific Design Center, Los Angeles
 1976: Embassy of the United States, Tokyo
 1977: Wintergarden Arboretum, Niagara Falls, New York, USA (demolished in 2009)

1980s 
 1980: Kyobo Life Insurance Building, Seoul, South Korea
 1981–1987: World Financial Center (now known as Brookfield Place), New York City, New York, USA
 1982–1984: Herring Hall at Rice University, Houston, Texas
 1982 Four Leaf Towers, Houston, Texas
 1983 Four Oaks Place, Houston, Texas
 1984: Residential Tower atop the Museum of Modern Art (MoMA), New York City
 1984–1986: Cleveland Clinic, Cleveland, Ohio, USA
 1984: Mattatuck Museum Arts and History Center renovation, Waterbury, Connecticut
 1987: Blumenthal Performing Arts Center, Charlotte, North Carolina
 1987–1990: Carnegie Hall Tower, New York City, New York, USA
 1987-89: Maryland Residence, Bethesda, Maryland, USA
 1987–1991: One Canada Square, Canary Wharf, London, England, UK
 1988: Wells Fargo Center (formerly Norwest Center), Minneapolis, Minnesota
 1989: Gaviidae Common, Minneapolis, Minnesota

1990s 
 1990: Nippon Telegraph and Telephone Headquarters, Tokyo, Japan
 1990: Roy Nutt Mathematics, Engineering & Computer Science Center at Trinity College, Hartford, Connecticut
 1990: 181 West Madison Street, Chicago
 1991: Key Tower, Cleveland, Ohio
 1991: 777 Tower, Los Angeles, California
 1991: O'Quinn (Formerly St. Lukes) Medical Tower, Houston, Texas
 1991: Frances Lehman Loeb Art Center at Vassar College, Poughkeepsie, New York
 1992: Bank of America Corporate Center, Charlotte, North Carolina
 1992: Plaza Tower, Costa Mesa, California
 1993: Wolfensohn Hall, Institute for Advanced Study In Princeton, New Jersey
 1993: Worrell Professional Center, Wake Forest University School of Law, Winston-Salem, North Carolina
 1994: Physics and Astronomy Building, University of Washington, Seattle, Washington USA
 1995: Aronoff Center for Performing Arts, Cincinnati, Ohio
 1995: 100 North Main Street (formerly Wachovia Center), Winston-Salem, North Carolina
 1996: Edificio República, Buenos Aires, Argentina
 1996: Residencial del Bosque, Mexico City, Mexico
 1996: Owens Corning World Headquarters, Toledo, Ohio, USA
 1997: Expansion of Washington National Airport, Washington, D.C.
 1998: Overture Center, Madison, Wisconsin
 1998: Petronas Twin Towers, Kuala Lumpur, Malaysia
 1998: Schuster Center, Dayton, Ohio, USA
 1999: Cheung Kong Center, Hong Kong
 1999: Zurich tower office building in The Hague, Netherlands

2000s 
 2000: Kurayoshi Park Square, Kurayoshi, Japan
 2000: Boston Bank Building, Buenos Aires, Argentina
 2000: KABC-TV, Los Angeles, California
 2001: Citigroup Centre, 25 Canada Square, Canary Wharf, London
 2001: Bucksbaum Center for the Arts at Grinnell College, Grinnell, Iowa
 2001: Athletic and Fitness Center at Grinnell College, Grinnell, Iowa
 2001: The Investment Building, Washington, D.C.
 2001: Atago Green Hills, Tokyo, Japan
 2002: JP MorganChase Building, San Francisco
 2002: Weber Music Hall at University of Minnesota Duluth, Duluth, Minnesota
 2002: Former Enron Headquarters at 1500 Louisiana Street, Houston
 2003: Gerald Ratner Athletics Center at University of Chicago, Chicago, Illinois
 2003: Two International Finance Centre, Hong Kong
 2013: Banco Macro Tower, Buenos Aires, Argentina
 2003: Center for Drama and Film & the Martel Theater at Vassar College, Poughkeepsie, New York
 2003: 25 Bank Street, Canary Wharf, Docklands, London
 2003: 40 Bank Street, Canary Wharf, Docklands, London
 2003: Benjamin & Mariam Schuster Performing Arts Center, Dayton, Ohio
 2004: Goldman Sachs Tower, Jersey City, New Jersey
 2004: Campus University Siglo 21, Córdoba, Argentina
 2004: Bloomberg Tower, New York, New York
 2005: Cira Centre, Philadelphia
 2005: Malone Engineering Center, Yale University, New Haven, Connecticut
 2006: Theodore Roosevelt Federal Courthouse, Brooklyn, New York
 2006: Science and Engineering Research and Classroom Complex at University of Houston, Houston
 2006: Minneapolis Public Library's Central branch, Minneapolis
 2006: Joe Rosenfield '25 Center, Grinnell College, Grinnell, Iowa
 2006: Renée and Henry Segerstrom Concert Hall, Segerstrom Center For The Arts, Orange County Performing Arts Center, Costa Mesa, California
 2006: Thomas E. Golden Jr. Center, St. Thomas More Catholic Chapel and Center, Yale University, New Haven, Connecticut
 2006: Adrienne Arsht Center for the Performing Arts, Miami
 2006: Madison Museum of Contemporary Art Madison, Wisconsin
 2008: BOK Center, Tulsa, Oklahoma
 2008: One Park West, Liverpool, England
 2008: Torre de Cristal, Madrid, Spain
 2008: Repsol-YPF Building, Buenos Aires, Argentina
 2008: St. Regis Residences & Hotel, Mexico City, Mexico
 2008: Business Instructional Facility, University of Illinois at Urbana–Champaign, Illinois
 2009: Cooperative Arts and Humanities High School, New Haven, Connecticut
 2009: Connecticut Science Center, Hartford, Connecticut
 2009: Aria Resort & Casino, the central feature of CityCenter, Las Vegas

2010s 
 2010: Shanghai IFC, Pudong, sister project of Two International Finance Centre in Hong Kong
 2010: Gran Torre Santiago, Santiago, Chile
 2010: Torre Mesoamericana, Tuxtla Gutiérrez, Mexico
 2011: Tokyo American Club, Tokyo, Japan
 2011: New Airport Terminal Building (Phase 1), Winnipeg James Armstrong Richardson International Airport, Winnipeg, Canada
 2011: Iberdrola Tower, office building, Bilbao, Spain
 2011: St. Katharine Drexel Chapel, Xavier University of Louisiana, New Orleans
 2012: Unicredit Tower, master plan and mixed-use development, Milan, Italy
 2012: Ark Hills Sengokuyama Mori Tower, Tokyo, Japan
 2013: The Landmark, Abu Dhabi, United Arab Emirates
 2013: DePaul University, The Theatre School, Chicago
 2014: Abeno Harukas, Osaka, Japan
 2015: Cameron and Edward Lanphier Center, Choate Rosemary Hall, Wallingford, Connecticut
 2015: Sevilla Tower, office building, Seville, Spain
 2015: Torre Sofia, San Pedro Garza García, Mexico
 2015: Maral Explanada, Mar del Plata, Argentina
 2016: McKinney & Olive, Mixed-Use Development Dallas
 2016: Hancher Auditorium, University of Iowa Iowa City, Iowa
 2016: The Cabin Stack Prefabricated House
 2016: Eccles Theater, performing arts center, Salt Lake City
 2017: Indiana University School of Informatics, Luddy Hall, Indiana University Bloomington, Indiana
 2017: Cira Center South, Philadelphia
 2017: Wintrust Arena, Chicago, Illinois
 2017: Sidra Medical Center, Qatar
 2018: Salesforce Tower, San Francisco
 2018: Transbay Transit Center, San Francisco
 2019: Louis Armstrong International Airport, New Terminal, New Orleans
 2022: Torre Mítikah, Mexico City

Under construction

 2019: Azabudai Hills, Tokyo, Japan
 2020: South Station Tower, Boston

Proposed
 2013: Mirador del Valle, Salta, Argentina
 1988: Miglin-Beitler Skyneedle, Chicago
 1965: Sunset Mountain Park, Santa Monica, California, Cesar Pelli and A.J.Lumsden
 1980: Indiana Tower, Indianapolis, Indiana

Duke University revitalization
In 2007, Duke University commissioned him to plan a 20- to 50-year revitalization of its Central Campus.

References

Pelli, Cesar